Naikap Purano Bhanjyang is a village and former Village Development Committee that is now part of Chandragiri Municipality in Kathmandu District in Province No. 3 of central Nepal. At the time of the 1991 Nepal census it had a population of 3,456. The highest terrains in this village locate westerly, in ward No.5. A panoramic beautiful scene of whole Kathmandu Valley from Sanga to Nagarkot and Swayambhunath to Kirtipur Chobar can be viewed very clearly. The height of this hilly region lies in between 1600 m to 1800 m. The whole Himalayan range from Langtang to Mahalangur can also be viewed.

References

Populated places in Kathmandu District